State Route 21 (SR-21) is a state highway in western Utah, running for  in Millard and Beaver Counties from the Nevada state line near Garrison to Beaver.

Route description

SR-21 begins at the Nevada state line as a continuation of Nevada State Route 487 and heads southeast through Garrison.   It continues southeast past Pruess Lake and continues through Mormon Gap and Halfway Summit.  It turns east around Lime Point into Corral Canyon and over Wah Wah Summit.  It then heads southeast between Grampian Hill and Squaw Peak into Squaw Gulch, where it turns northeast over Frisco Summit and east through the ghost town of Frisco.  It then turns southeast and continues to Milford. SR-21 leaves Milford heading southeast across an agricultural area to Minersville.  In Minersville, it turns east past Yellow Mountain, then turns northeast past Minersville Lake State Park.  It continues through Adamsville, then turns east around Little Bald Hill through Greenville into Beaver.  In Beaver, it crosses I-15 without an interchange, the continues to end at an intersection with Business Loop I-15 (SR-160).

History
The road from SR-1 (by 1926 US-91, now SR-160) in Beaver west to Milford was added to the state highway system in 1910, and it was extended west to Newhouse in 1916. The state legislature assigned the SR-21 designation to the route in 1927, and continued it northwest from Newhouse to the Nevada state line, where it became SR 73 towards Ely. In 1941, SR-21 was extended east from Beaver to US-89 at Junction, but this became SR-153 in 1945.

Major intersections

References

External links

021
 021
 021